The 2020–21 Coupe de France preliminary rounds, Paris-Île-de-France was the qualifying competition to decide which teams from the leagues of the Paris-Île-de-France region of France took part in the main competition from the seventh round.

A total of nine teams qualified from the Paris-Île-de-France preliminary rounds. In 2019–20, Red Star progressed furthest in the main competition, reaching the round of 32 before losing to Nice 2–1.

Schedule
On 17 July 2020, the league announced that a preliminary round would be required, due to the reduction of teams qualifying for the seventh round, and that this round would take place on 30 August 2020. This round involved 248 teams from the District leagues. The remaining 126 teams from the District leagues entered at the first round stage, which took place on 6 September. The second round on 13 September saw the entry of the teams from the Regional leagues.

The third round draw, which saw the entry into the competition of the Championnat National 3 teams, was made on 15 September 2020. The fourth round draw, which saw the entry into the competition of the Championnat National 2 teams, was made on 24 September 2020. The fifth round draw, which saw the two Championnat National teams from the region join the competition, was made on 7 October 2020. The sixth round draw was made on 20 October 2020.

Preliminary round
These matches were played on 30 August 2020.

First round
These matches were played on 6 September 2020.

Second round
These matches were played on 13 September 2020.

Third round
These matches were played on 19 and 20 September 2020.

Fourth round
These matches were played on 3 and 4 October 2020, with one postponed until 7 October 2020.

Fifth round
These matches were played on 17 and 18 October 2020, with one postponed until 30 January 2021.

Sixth round
These matches were played on 30 and 31 January 2021, with one postponed until 6 February 2021.

References

Preliminary rounds